The Commanding General of United States Army Pacific (CG USARPAC or CG, USARPAC) is the commander of United States Army Pacific, the army service component command of United States Indo-Pacific Command (USINDOPACOM). As CG USARPAC, the officeholder is responsible for United States Army forces stationed within INDOPACOM's area of operations, including Hawaii, South Korea and Japan. United States Army Alaska was initially under CG USARPAC's authority until it was transferred to United States Northern Command.

The current Commanding General, United States Army Pacific is General Charles A. Flynn, who succeeded General Paul LaCamera in a change of command ceremony on June 3, 2021. He is the 37th commanding general since the formation of USARPAC as a regional command, the 13th since the creation of its current iteration, and the 9th since its designation as a service component command in 2000.

Rank

When the modern iteration of USARPAC was created, the holder of the position was a three-star lieutenant general. In July 2013, USARPAC transitioned into a four-star command with the confirmation of Vincent K. Brooks to the position "to broaden political-military aims through increased shaping activities and building partner capacity in the USARPAC area of responsibility".

List of commanders

Commander, District of Hawaii

Commander, Department of Hawaii

Commander, Hawaiian Department

Commanding General, United States Army Pacific

See also
United States Army Pacific
Commanding General, United States Army Europe and Africa
List of active duty United States four-star officers

Notes

References

Lists of American military personnel
United States Army organization
Commanding General, Army Pacific